Chandrodaya is a 1999 Indian Kannada-language romance drama film directed by S. Mahendar. It stars Shiva Rajkumar, Ramesh Aravind and Prema. It is a remake of Mani Ratnam's 1986 Tamil film Mouna Ragam.

Plot

Cast 
 Ramesh Aravind as Sunil Kumar
 Prema as Divya
 Shiva Rajkumar as Shivu (extended Cameo)
 Bhavana
 Avinash
 Vinaya Prasad as a lawyer
 Sihi Kahi Chandru
 Ramesh Bhat

Production 
Filming took place in Mysore and New Delhi. Four song sequences for the film were shot in Mysore and its vicinity in December 1998.

Soundtrack 
Hamsalekha scored music for the film including its soundtracks in addition to writing its lyrics. The soundtrack album constitutes six tracks.

Reception 
Srikanth Srinivasa, reviewing the film for Deccan Herald, called the film "fairly decent" and wrote, "The film could have been easily trimmed in the dull first half. Music is mediocre by Hamsalekha's standards, except for the song Baaro baaro geleya... Director S Mahendar has faltered in the fight sequences of the film." He further wrote, "Ramesh is controlled and wooden as his character demands. Prema is pleasing and endearing as ever. Prema has put up a spirited performance. However, Ramesh looks jaded in the fight sequences that have been done badly. Shiva Rajkumar is wasted and so is Doddanna." S. Shiva Kumar wrote in The Times of India, "Director Mahender is catching up on the Tamil classics of the '80s. So, after a rehash of Bharathi Rajaa's Kadalora Kavidhaigal, it's Mani's Mouna Raagam. Mahender takes his job seriously and even the simplest of shots have the same camera angle. The most impressive aspect is that he doesn't tamper with the original and tries to use his imagination. If you haven't seen the original, this is not bad at all and is several notches above what's being served today It would have been much better if Mahender had used the original background score by Ilayaraja which was superb". Y Maheswara Reddy of The New Indian Express wrote, "Director Mahendar has taken every care to make it watchable by bringing out all the talent of the artists in this film".

References

External links 
 

1990s Kannada-language films
1999 films
1999 romantic drama films
Films directed by S. Mahendar
Films scored by Hamsalekha
Indian romantic drama films
Kannada remakes of Tamil films